The Asian Studies Association of Australia is a professional association for peak body of university experts and educators in Asian Studies in Australia.

The Oriental Society of Australia, founded in 1956, was Sydney-focused although in principle national in membership, and initiatives to make it more national in scope were explored without success.   Consequently, after an exploratory meeting of the 'Asian Scholars of Australia and New Zealand' during the International Congress of Orientalists in Canberra in 1971, the ASAA was established at a meeting held in Canberra during the ANZAAS Conference in January 1975 and adopted a constitution at its first National Conference in May 1976. Membership is primarily drawn from the university sector and consists of individuals engaged in teaching or research in any field of Asian studies, including language teaching.

Affairs of the association are administered by the executive committee, which consists of the president, vice-president, secretary, treasurer and publications officer. Policy of the association is determined by the council, which comprises the members of the executive committee, one member each representing four regions of Asia and three members elected as general representatives.

The association holds a biennial national conference and since 1990 has published the Asian Studies Review. Its monograph series have published through commercial presses a significant number of influential works in Asian studies. The ASAA makes regular submissions to governments and universities on matters relating to Asian studies, the professional interests of its members, tertiary and secondary education about Asia, and Asia-Australia relations. A major report published in 2002, Maximizing Australia's Asia Knowledge, argued for increased government investment in Asian Studies.

The following have served as ASAA presidents: 
1976-78 John Legge;
1979-80 Wang Gungwu;
1981-2 Anthony Low;
1983-4 Stephen FitzGerald; 
1985-6Jamie Mackie;
1987-8 & 1989-90: Elaine McKay;
1991-92 John Ingleson;
1993-94 Colin Mackerras; 
1995-96 Beverly Hooper;
1997-98 Anthony Reid;
1999-2000 Robert Elson;
2001-02 Tessa Morris-Suzuki; 
2003-04 Robin Jeffrey;
2005-06 Robert Cribb;
2007-08 Michael Leigh, replaced by Robert Cribb;
2009-10 Kathryn Robinson;
2011-12 Purnendra Jain;
2013-14 Louise Edwards;
2017-18 Kent Anderson;
2019-20 Edward Aspinall;
2021-22 Kate McGregor;
2023- Melissa Crouch;

References

External links

Asian studies
Learned societies of Australia